Concrete is a ghost town in southwestern Guadalupe County, Texas, alongside the present Farm Road 775, approximately  north of La Vernia  south of New Berlin.

Sources
"The Good Old Days a history of LaVernia" by the Civic Government class of LaVernia High School, 1936–1937 school year.
"Wilson County Centennial 1860-1960"  By the Wilson county library, Centennial program handed out at The 100yr centennial celebration.           
"The Concrete Cemetery" A webpage by Shirley Grammar, Concrete Cemetery historian.
"Concrete Cemetery" A Texas Historical Commission historical marker.

Towns in Texas
Geography of Guadalupe County, Texas
Ghost towns in South Texas